Martin Hristov may refer to:
 Martin Hristov (footballer, born 1980), Bulgarian footballer
 Martin Hristov (footballer, born 1997), Macedonian footballer
 Martin Hristov (Undercover), a fictional character on the BNT crime series Undercover